M'Tarfa is a town and commune in M'Sila Province, Algeria. The commune is approximately 223 square kilometers in area. According to the 1998 census it has a population of 7,621. The 2008 census showed that the population had increased to 8,704, an increase of +0.59% per year. The commune has a desert climate and receives very little rainfall.

References

Communes of M'Sila Province
Cities in Algeria